Choi Jin-sung may refer to:

 Choi Jin-sung (director),  South Korean film director and screenwriter
 Choi Jin-sung (gymnast),  South Korean gymnast